Lyle Bruce Mcpherson Hone (26 July 1913 – 13 June 1946) was an Australian rules footballer who played with Hawthorn in the Victorian Football League (VFL).

Family
The son of Thomas Colin Hone (1883–1951), and Margaret Pearl Hone (1888–1965), née Johnson, Lyle Bruce Mcpherson Hone was born at Brighton, Victoria on 26 July 1913.

He married Olive Maude Duell (1910–1985), later Mrs. Albert Eddy McGill, in 1937.

Military service
He enlisted in the Second AIF on 12 July 1941.

Death
He died at the Alfred Hospital, Prahran, Victoria, on 13 June 1946.

Notes

References
 
 World War Two Nominal Roll: Sapper Lyle Bruce McPherson (VX59406), Department of Veterans' Affairs.
 B883, VX59406: World War Two Service Record: Sapper Lyle Bruce McPherson (VX59406), National Archives of Australia.

External links 

Bruce Hone's playing statistics from The VFA Project

1913 births
1946 deaths
Australian rules footballers from Melbourne
Brighton Football Club players
Hawthorn Football Club players
Australian Army personnel of World War II
Australian Army soldiers
Australian military personnel killed in World War II
People from Brighton, Victoria
Military personnel from Melbourne